Howard Tellus "Lefty" Ross (April 23, 1903 – December 21, 1963) was an American baseball pitcher in the Negro leagues. He played from 1924 to 1927 with the Cleveland Browns, Chicago American Giants, Indianapolis ABCs, Cleveland Elites, and Cleveland Hornets.

References

External links
 and Seamheads

Cleveland Browns (baseball) players
Chicago American Giants players
Indianapolis ABCs players
Cleveland Elites players
Cleveland Hornets players
1903 births
1963 deaths
Baseball pitchers
Baseball players from Ohio
People from Ravenna, Ohio
20th-century African-American sportspeople